Kuntagodu Vibhuthi Subbanna (20 February 1932 – 16 July 2005) was an acclaimed dramatist and writer in Kannada. He was the founder of the world-famous NINASAM (Neelanakantheshwara Natya Sangha) drama institute. Founded in 1949 in Heggodu, Sagara. Ninasam, under the guidance of K.V. Subbanna, made significant contribution to Kannada theatre and other performing arts. He was awarded, in 1991, the Ramon Magsaysay Award for Journalism, Literature, and Creative Communication Arts, in recognition of his contribution to enrich rural Karnataka with the world's best films and the delight and wonder of the living stage. He was awarded the Padma Shri during 2004–05.

Under the influence of Shantaveri Gopala Gowda, a senior leader of the socialist movement in Karnataka, Subbanna espoused socialist ideology, to which he was committed throughout his life. To promote Kannada dramas Subbanna set up training centres in various parts of Karnataka. He also established Akshara Prakashana, a publishing house, to publish literature in Kannada related to theatre, which included translations of plays from other languages. His son K. V. Akshara is also a playwright.

Awards and recognition
 Ramon Magsaysay Award in 1991
 Sangeet Natak Akademi Award in 1994
 Sahitya Akademi Award in 2003
 Padma Shree in 2004

Notes

External links
 Sudhanva Deshpande, 'The World was his Stage', 
 Remembering Subbanna at kamat.com

1932 births
2005 deaths
Indian theatre directors
Recipients of the Padma Shri in arts
Recipients of the Sangeet Natak Akademi Award
Subbanna, K.V.
People from Shimoga district
Ramon Magsaysay Award winners
Kannada people
Recipients of the Sahitya Akademi Award in Kannada
20th-century Indian dramatists and playwrights
Dramatists and playwrights from Karnataka